Hyliidae is a family of passerine birds which contains just two species, the green hylia (Hylia prasina) and the tit hylia (Pholidornis rushiae).  Physiological similarities and molecular phylogenetic studies strongly support the creation of this family.

Some taxonomic authorities place the entire family in the Macrosphenidae.

Hylias are small, insectivorous songbirds found in tropical Africa.  They frequent the understory of wet tropical forests.

Taxonomy
The family Hyliidae was introduced in 1923 by the British ornithologist David Bannerman. The family contains just two species, each of which is placed in its own genus.

Genera 
 Pholidornis – tit hylia (formerly in Remizidae, then tentatively in Cettiidae)
 Hylia – green hylia (formerly tentatively placed in Cettiidae)

References

 
Bird families